Immediately adjacent, in legal usage, generally means "adjoining or abutting, rather than in the vicinity". See, e.g., Parsons v Wethersfield, 135 Conn 24, 60 A2d 771, 4 ALR2d 330 - This definition of the term was given in a statutory provision requiring a unanimous vote of the commission on a question of rezoning property over the protest of 20 percent of the owners of lots "immediately adjacent".

Legal terminology